James Anderson FRSE FSAScot (1739 – 15 October 1808) was a Scottish agriculturist, journalist and economist. A member of the Edinburgh Philosophical Society, Anderson was a prominent figure in the Scottish Enlightenment. He invented the Scotch plough.

Life
Anderson was born at Hermiston, Midlothian and while still young attended lectures on chemistry by William Cullen, at the University of Edinburgh. At the age of 15, after the death of his parents, he took over the working of the family farm.

In 1768 he  moved to Aberdeenshire to manage the  farm of Monkshill on land owned by Mr. Udny of Udny under a long lease granted to him for the purpose of demonstrating the benefits of improved agriculture.

Economic theorist

In 1777 Anderson published An Enquiry into the Nature of the Corn Laws, in which he anticipated David Ricardo's theory of rent. Some historians believe Anderson was the root source for Marx's critique of capitalist agriculture.

Rent, Anderson argued, was a charge for the use of the more fertile soil. The least fertile soils in cultivation generated an income that simply covered the costs of production, while the more fertile soils received a "certain premium for an exclusive privilege to cultivate them; which will be greater or smaller according to the more or less fertility of the soil. It is this premium which constitutes what we now call rent; a medium by means of which the expence of cultivating soils of very different degrees of fertility may be reduced to a perfect quality." Anderson argued that improvement of the soil was possible; but also that humans could degrade the soil. He argued also that since where farm land in England was held by capitalists, the farmer would tend to avoid improvements the full return for which would not be received during the lease.

Karl Marx's critique of capitalist agriculture drew upon Anderson's analysis and he insisted that soil fertility was a historical issue, and that fertility could both improve or decline. The irrationality of capitalist agriculture, he argued, was bound up with the whole antagonism of town and country out of which bourgeois society had arisen.

Publisher
In 1783 he settled in Edinburgh. In 1791 he started a weekly publication called The Bee, which was largely written by himself, and of which 18 volumes were published. In 1797 he began to reside at Isleworth, and from 1799 to 1802 he produced a monthly publication, Recreations in Agriculture, Natural History, Arts and Miscellaneous Literature. He was also the author of many pamphlets on agricultural and economical topics, under numerous aliases, including Agricola, Germanicus, and Timothy Hairbrain. One of his first publications was A Practical Treatise on Chimneys (1776). He was a friend of Jeremy Bentham, and involved in the latter's idea of an ideal prison or Panopticon. Anderson also corresponded with George Washington.

Inventor
The engineer James Green, responsible for the building of some of the first canalboat lifts, credited their invention to Dr James Anderson.

The Scotch plough or Scots plough (not to be confused with the Scottish hand plough) was a wood and iron, animal draft, primary tillage implement (plough) for use on heavy ground invented in the 19th century by James Anderson.

Honorarium
In 1780 Anderson received an LLD (honorary doctorate in law) from the University of Aberdeen. He was elected a member of the American Philosophical Society in 1791. He died in West Ham, Essex on 15 October 1808.

Family
In 1768 Anderson married Margaret Seton (d. 1788). Together they had 13 children, one daughter and five sons survived their father; their son, John, was apprenticed to Thomas Bewick. Their daughter, Margaret (1778–1863), married Benjamin Outram.

References

Further reading

External links

 Dr. James Anderson (honorary doctorate in law, 1780, Aberdeen), in History of Economic Thought, Scottish Enlightenment, Center for Economic Policy Analysis (CEPA), New School University
(1777) Observations on the Means of Exciting a Spirit of National Industry

Attribution

1739 births
1808 deaths
Scientists from Edinburgh
Scottish economists
Scottish inventors
Journalists from Edinburgh
Scottish agronomists
Founder Fellows of the Royal Society of Edinburgh
Scottish antiquarians
18th-century Scottish farmers
Scottish editors
Scottish publishers (people)
Alumni of the University of Edinburgh
Members of the Philosophical Society of Edinburgh
18th-century Scottish writers
19th-century Scottish writers
Scottish agriculturalists
Fellows of the Society of Antiquaries of Scotland
Fellows of the Royal Society of Edinburgh
19th-century Scottish farmers